Carl Kuntze (29 October 1922 – 26 May 2006) was a Dutch rower. He competed in the men's coxless pair event at the 1952 Summer Olympics.

References

External links
 

1922 births
2006 deaths
Dutch male rowers
Olympic rowers of the Netherlands
Rowers at the 1952 Summer Olympics
Sportspeople from Rotterdam
20th-century Dutch people